Thetis was built at Chittagong in 1794. She made one voyage to England for the British East India Company (EIC) in 1801. She was rebuilt at Calcutta in 1817 and at Moulmein in 1838. She was still sailing out of Calcutta in 1839.

EIC voyage (1801): Captain John Power sailed from Madras on 17 March 1801. Thetis reached the Cape on 17 July and St Helena on 19 August. She arrived at the Downs on 1 November.

 

Thetis did not appear on a list of ships built in India that transferred their registry to Great Britain prior to 1814. She did appear in Lloyd's Register (LR).

In 1813 the EIC had lost its monopoly on the trade between India and Britain. Thereafter British ships were then free to sail to India or the Indian Ocean under a licence from the EIC.

Citations and references
Citations

References
 
 
 

1794 ships
British ships built in India
Ships of the British East India Company
Age of Sail merchant ships of England